Glee is an American musical comedy-drama television series that aired on Fox from May 19, 2009, to March 20, 2015. It was nominated for a variety of different awards including thirty-two Emmy Awards (six wins), eleven Satellite Awards (five wins), nine Golden Globe Awards (four wins), thirty Teen Choice Awards (fourteen wins), three Writers Guild of America Awards, and three Directors Guild of America Awards. Amongst the wins for the series are a Satellite Award for "Best Television Series – Musical or Comedy", a Screen Actors Guild Award for Outstanding Performance by an Ensemble in a Comedy Series", and a People's Choice Award for "Favorite New TV Comedy".

The series had an ensemble cast and several different Glee actors received acting award nominations. Jane Lynch, Matthew Morrison, Lea Michele and Chris Colfer all won Satellite Awards and were nominated for Golden Globe and Emmy Awards. Lynch was nominated for eighteen individual awards (winning eight), the most of any cast members. Several crew members were also nominated for awards, with series creator Ryan Murphy nominated for three Writers Guild of America Awards and two Directors Guild of America Awards.



AfterEllen.com and AfterElton.com Awards

The gay media websites AfterEllen.com and AfterElton.com run Lesbian/Bisexual and Gay People's Choice Awards respectively, as well as Visibility Awards for the LGBT community. The awards are voted on by the websites' users.

Dorian Awards

In the Dorian Awards' inaugural year, 2010, Glee won in three categories. It won in four categories in 2011, with the "TV Comedy Performance of the Year" award resulting in a tie between Chris Colfer and Jane Lynch.

Emmy Awards

Primetime Emmy Awards

Creative Arts Emmy Awards

Golden Globe Awards

Glee won "Best Television Series – Musical or Comedy" at the Hollywood Foreign Press Association's 2010 Golden Globe Awards. Lea Michele, Jane Lynch and Matthew Morrison all received nominations in acting categories. The show was nominated for exactly the same awards at the 2011 Golden Globe Awards with the addition of a nomination for Chris Colfer for Best Supporting Actor, and Colfer and the series both won. In 2012, it was only nominated in the series category, and did not win.

Grammy Awards
The Grammy Awards are awarded annually by the National Academy of Recording Arts and Sciences of the United States. Glee Cast has been nominated for three awards.
 
|-
| style="text-align:center;" rowspan="2"| 2011
|Glee: The Music, Volume 1
| Best Compilation Soundtrack Album for a Motion Picture, Television or Other Visual Media
| 
|-
|  
| Best Pop Performance by a Duo or Group with Vocals
| 
|-
| style="text-align:center;"|  2012
|Glee: The Music, Volume 4
| Best Compilation Soundtrack Album for a Motion Picture, Television or Other Visual Media
| 
|}

People's Choice Awards

The People's Choice Awards recognize the people and work of popular culture, and are voted on by the general public. Glee won the "Favorite New TV Comedy" award in 2010, and was nominated for three awards in 2011.

Satellite Awards

The Satellite Awards, formerly known as the Golden Satellite Awards, are presented both for cinema and television. Glee has won five awards, including "Outstanding Guest Star" for special guest star Kristin Chenoweth.

Teen Choice Awards

The Teen Choice Awards are voted on by teenagers. Glee was nominated for three awards in 2009, thirteen awards in 2010, and nine awards in both 2011 and 2013. It won three awards annually starting in 2010, increasing to four in 2013.

Other awards

Notes
 for "Outstanding Comedy Series": "Pilot" and "Preggers"; "Wheels" and "Sectionals"; "The Power of Madonna" and "Home".

 for "Outstanding Comedy Series": "Audition" and "Silly Love Songs"; "Original Song" and "The Substitute"; "Duets" and "Never Been Kissed".

 for "Outstanding Performance by an Ensemble in a Comedy Series": Dianna Agron, Chris Colfer, Patrick Gallagher, Jessalyn Gilsig, Jane Lynch, Jayma Mays, Kevin McHale, Lea Michele, Cory Monteith, Heather Morris, Matthew Morrison, Amber Riley, Naya Rivera, Mark Salling, Harry Shum, Jr., Josh Sussman, Dijon Talton, Iqbal Theba and Jenna Ushkowitz.

 for "Outstanding Performance by an Ensemble in a Comedy Series": Max Adler, Dianna Agron, Chris Colfer, Jane Lynch, Jayma Mays, Kevin McHale, Lea Michele, Cory Monteith, Heather Morris, Matthew Morrison, Mike O'Malley, Amber Riley, Naya Rivera, Mark Salling, Harry Shum, Jr., Iqbal Theba, Jenna Ushkowitz.

 for "Outstanding Performance by an Ensemble in a Comedy Series": Dianna Agron, Chris Colfer, Darren Criss, Ashley Fink, Dot-Marie Jones, Jane Lynch, Jayma Mays, Kevin McHale, Lea Michele, Cory Monteith, Heather Morris, Matthew Morrison, Mike O'Malley, Chord Overstreet, Lauren Potter, Amber Riley, Naya Rivera, Mark Salling, Harry Shum, Jr., Iqbal Theba, Jenna Ushkowitz.

 for "Outstanding Performance by an Ensemble in a Comedy Series": Dianna Agron, Chris Colfer, Darren Criss, Samuel Larsen, Vanessa Lengies, Jane Lynch, Jayma Mays, Kevin McHale, Lea Michele, Cory Monteith, Heather Morris, Matthew Morrison, Alex Newell, Chord Overstreet, Amber Riley, Naya Rivera, Mark Salling, Harry Shum, Jr., Jenna Ushkowitz.

References

External links
 Awards for Glee at the Internet Movie Database

Awards
Glee